Teller Brothers–Reed Tobacco Historic District is a historic cigar factory and tobacco warehouse complex and national historic district located at Lancaster, Lancaster County, Pennsylvania. It includes five contributing buildings, built between about 1865 and 1900. They are the John F. Reed & Co. Cigar Factory (c. 1865), J.R. Bitner Tobacco Warehouse (c. 1880), Lancaster Paint Works (c. 1900), and two warehouses associated with the Teller Brothers, built about 1877 and 1885.  All five buildings are brick buildings over stone foundations, 2 1/2- to 4 stories tall, and used for the processing and storage of cigar leaf tobacco.

It was listed on the National Register of Historic Places in 1990.

References

Industrial buildings and structures on the National Register of Historic Places in Pennsylvania
Historic districts on the National Register of Historic Places in Pennsylvania
Buildings and structures in Lancaster, Pennsylvania
Historic districts in Lancaster County, Pennsylvania
Tobacco buildings in the United States
National Register of Historic Places in Lancaster, Pennsylvania